The 2019 IndyCar Classic was the 2nd round of the 2019 IndyCar season. The race was held on March 24, 2019, in Austin, Texas. Will Power qualified on pole position, while rookie Colton Herta took his first career victory becoming the youngest IndyCar race winner of all time.

Results

Qualifying

Race 

Notes:
 Points include 1 point for leading at least 1 lap during a race, an additional 2 points for leading the most race laps, and 1 point for Pole Position.

Championship standings after the race

Drivers' Championship standings

Manufacturer standings

 Note: Only the top five positions are included.

References 

IndyCar Classic
IndyCar Classic
IndyCar Classic
IndyCar Classic